Jeremi Kubicki (6 April 1911 – 6 December 1938) was a Polish painter. His work was part of the art competitions at the 1932 Summer Olympics and the 1936 Summer Olympics. He committed suicide by shooting himself in 1938.

Gallery

References

1911 births
1938 deaths
20th-century Polish painters
20th-century Polish male artists
Artists from Łódź
Academy of Fine Arts in Warsaw alumni
Olympic competitors in art competitions
Polish male painters
1938 suicides
Suicides by firearm in Poland